Reza Rahmani (born 1966) is an Iranian politician and former Minister of Industry, Mines and Business.

Life
Rahmani was born in Tabriz. He is a member of the 7th, 8th and 9th Islamic Consultative Assembly from the electorate of Tabriz, Osku and Azarshahr with Alireza Mondi Sefidan, Masoud Pezeshkian, Mir-Hadi Gharaseyyed Romiani, Mohammad Hosein Farhanghi and Mohammad Esmaeil Saeidi. Rahmani won with 125,037 (39.95%) votes.

In March 2020, after the COVID-19 pandemic became known to have spread to Iran, the Ministry of Industry said that Reza Rahmani was hospitalised in the intensive care unit of a hospital in Tehran due to "chemical injuries" although Iranian media had reported that he had been infected with novel coronavirus. On 11 March, his infection was confirmed by semi-official Fars News Agency. On 11 March, it was stated that Rahmani was believed to have recovered after receiving treatment in hospital.

References

External links
 Rahmani Website

People from Tabriz
Deputies of Tabriz, Osku and Azarshahr
Living people
1966 births
Members of the 9th Islamic Consultative Assembly
Members of the 8th Islamic Consultative Assembly
Members of the 7th Islamic Consultative Assembly
Followers of Wilayat fraction members
Moderation and Development Party politicians